The following is a timeline of the history of Jaffa.

Prior to 20th century

 14th century BCE – Egyptians in power.
12th to 9th century BCE – Jaffa becomes an important port city under the Philistines, and the northernmost city of the Philistine state. 
8th century BCE – The Assyrian Empire manages to conquer Jaffa from the Philistines.
330 BCE – Coins minted in Jaffa, then under Alexander the Great's Hellenistic Empire.
301 BCE – Jaffa becomes part of the Ptolemaic Kingdom.
200 BCE – Jaffa becomes part of the Seleucid Empire.
 68 CE – Jaffa becomes part of the Roman Empire under Vespasian.
 636 CE – Jaffa is taken from the Romans (Byzantins) by Arab forces under Caliph Omar.
 1099 AD – Jaffa is temporarily taken from the Muslims by the Christian Crusaders.
 1126 AD – Knights of St. John in power in Jaffa.
 1187 – Saladin retakes Jaffa.
 1191 – Jaffa taken by forces of Crusader King Richard I of England.
 1196 – Saladin's brother Al-Adil I retakes Jaffa.
 1252 – Jaffa once again taken from the Arabs by forces of Christian King Louis IX of France.
1268 – The Arabs reconquer Jaffa and again expel the Crusaders.
 1538 – Bab el-Halil (gate) built.
 1517 – Ottomans in power.
1654 – Roman Catholic St. Peter's Church built under Ottoman rule.
 1799
 3–7 March: Jaffa besieged by French forces under Napoleon.
 June: French ousted by British forces.
 1807 – Muhammad Abu-Nabbut becomes governor.
 1831 – Ibrahim Pasha in power.
 1837 – The Galilee earthquake produces high intensity shaking along the Dead Sea Transform on January 1 causing 6,000–7,000 casualties.
 1838 – Sephardic Talmud Torah school founded in Jaffa.
1839 – Ashkenazi Jews coming from Europe settle in Jaffa.
 1865 – Jaffa lighthouse built.
 1866 – Population: 5,000. Foundation of the Jaffa American Colony.
 1868 – German Colony established.
 1871 – Municipal council established.
1879 – Jaffa city walls demolished to accommodate growth of city.
 1884 – Ashkenazic Talmud Torah school established.
 1887 – Population: 14,000.
 1891 – Ramla-Jaffa railway begins operating; Jaffa Railway Station opens; Hospital Sha'ar Ziyyon founded.
 1892 – Jaffa–Jerusalem railway completed.
 1897 – Population: 33,465.

20th century
 1902 – Cholera epidemic; Trumpeldor Cemetery established.
 1908 – March: Zionist-Palestinian unrest.
 1909 – Tel Aviv founded near Jaffa.
 1911 – Filastin newspaper begins publication.
 1913 – Population: 50,000.
 1916 – Hassan Bek Mosque built.
 1917 – April: Jaffa deportation: amidst World War I, all inhabitants of Jaffa (including Tel Aviv), Jews and Muslims alike, are expelled from the city on Ottoman orders.
1917 – December: Battle of Jaffa (1917).
 1918 – Muslim-Christian Association established.
 1921 – May: Jaffa riots.
 1932 – National Congress of Arab Youth held.
 1936 – April: Arab-Jewish unrest.
 1945 – Al-Najjada paramilitary youth group established.
 1947 – In the United Nations Partition Plan for Palestine, Jaffa is proposed to be within the new Arab state, as opposed to Tel Aviv, which would be part of the Jewish State.
 1948 – Israeli declaration of Independence; on 14 May, Zionist Irgun forces take Jaffa, which becomes part of the new State of Israel.
 1950 – Jaffa attached to Tel Aviv: Tel Aviv-Jaffa municipality formed on 24 April. Jaffa Administration (municipal department) established.
 1960 – Company for the Development of Ancient Jaffa established.

See also
 History of Jaffa
 Timeline of the history of the region of Palestine

References

This article incorporates information from the French Wikipedia.

Bibliography

Published in 19th century
 . Published circa 1820s
 

 
  (+ 1876 ed. and 1912 ed.)

Published in 20th century
 
 
 
 
 
 
 
 

Published in 21st century
 "Jaffa — Bride of the Sea" or "Yaffo — Kalat Hayam" 2000, By Israeli artist Natali Lipin (views of the city Old Jaffa). Language — Hebrew/English.
 
 
 
 
 
 
 
  (about Alexandria, Jaffa, Salonika, Smyrna)

External links

 Digital Public Library of America. Items related to Jaffa, various dates
 Europeana. Items related to Jaffa, various dates.

 2
Jaffa
Tel Aviv-related lists
Jaffa
jaffa
Jaffa